Monavari or Munavari or Manavari or Manavvari or Manuri may refer to:
 Manavari, Kermanshah
 Monavari, South Khorasan